Hospital Canselor Tuanku Muhriz UKM or HCTM, formerly known as Hospital Universiti Kebangsaan Malaysia (HUKM), is one of the five university hospitals in Malaysia. It is located in Bandar Tun Razak, Kuala Lumpur and is administered by Universiti Kebangsaan Malaysia (UKM).

The hospital has a special ward for cancer treatment sponsored by MAKNA and Maybank.

History
Hospital Canselor Tuanku Muhriz UKM has an interlinked history with the Faculty of Medicine, UKM. The faculty was formed on 30 May 1972. This faculty started the premedical course at the Faculty of Sciences, Main Campus of UKM at Jalan Pantai Baru, Kuala Lumpur in May 1973. The first batch numbering up to 44 students attended the course. Preclinical Medical Course started in May 1974 at the temporary building allocated for Medical Faculty in the Kuala Lumpur Hospital (HKL) area. On 27 February 1975, the Ministry of Health officially agreed to designate HKL as the teaching hospital for UKM and since May 1976 all clinical courses are done at HKL. In 1977, a permanent building for the Medical Faculty beside HKL was completed and could be used fully.

Alongside the faculty building, courses related to medicine are also being conducted at the Branch Campus, Hospital Branch Tanjung Karang and Health Clinic Ibu at Tanjung Karang, Selangor. Research in the field of medicine was increased to improve the faculty's role in the field of medicine and education. By increasing the number of medical students and by starting the Degree Continuation Program, the usage of clinical equipment training at Ministry of Health hospitals was expanded.

Furthermore, with the Ministry of Health and the Faculty of Medicine worked in close co-operation, more doctors have successfully graduated. The medical students are trained in General Surgery, Orthopedic Surgery and Otolaryngology Surgery, Ophthalmology Surgery, Radiology, Pediatric, Psychiatric, Anesthesiology, Medicine and Obstetric & Gynecology. The Faculty of Medicine currently offers courses at the Doctor of Philosophy level for the preclinical program.

Support for expansion and in line with the needs of the nation caused the allocated building for Faculty of Medicine and HKL unable to fulfill the current requirements for educating, service and research. In 1990, the Faculty of Medicine decided to set up its own teaching hospital for long-term use. On 2 November 1993, construction of the Hospital Universiti Kebangsaan Malaysia in Cheras commenced.

By 1 July 1997, HUKM was completed and started operating and on 14 July 1998, Mahathir Mohamad, the then Prime Minister of Malaysia officially opened HUKM.

However, on 14 December 2007, the Faculty of Medicine and HUKM have combined to create the entity known as Pusat Perubatan UKM, or UKM Medical Centre, with the motto For Integrating Learning and Research Society. PPUKM was led by a Dean cum Director who is responsible for managing all of the academic, research and clinical services at the centre. The restructured entity will allow the functions and activities of the separate institutions, faculties and hospitals to coordinate and run more efficiently, improving productivity and ways of working. This will ensure that the administration course activities and research can be done more efficiently, including services offered. All this will improve PPUKM performance and increase its standard in international medical institutions.

See also
 List of medical schools in Malaysia
 List of university hospitals

References

External links
 
 UKM Specialist Centre
 Ministry of Health Malaysia

National University of Malaysia
1976 establishments in Malaysia
Hospital buildings completed in 1997
Hospitals established in 1976
Hospitals in Kuala Lumpur
Teaching hospitals in Malaysia